This is a list of independent Royal Australian Air Force aircraft flights.  It includes flights which did not form part of a parent squadron and flying units of less than squadron status.

Air ambulance units
No. 1 Air Ambulance Unit RAAF
No. 2 Air Ambulance Unit RAAF

Air-sea rescue flights
No. 111 Air-Sea Rescue Flight RAAF
No. 112 Air-Sea Rescue Flight RAAF
No. 113 Air-Sea Rescue Flight RAAF
No. 114 Air-Sea Rescue Flight RAAF
No. 115 Air-Sea Rescue Flight RAAF

Air observation post flights
No. 16 Air Observation Post Flight RAAF
No. 17 Air Observation Post Flight RAAF

Communication units

No. 1 Communication Unit RAAF
No. 2 Communication Unit RAAF
No. 3 Communication Unit RAAF
No. 4 Communication Unit RAAF
No. 5 Communication Unit RAAF
No. 6 Communication Unit RAAF
No. 7 Communication Unit RAAF
No. 8 Communication Unit RAAF
No. 9 Communication Unit RAAF
No. 10 Communication Unit RAAF
No. 11 Communication Unit RAAF
No. 12 Communication Unit RAAF
No. 13 Communication Unit RAAF
No. 30 Communication Unit RAAF

Forward air control flights
No. 4 Forward Air Control Flight RAAF 
Forward Air Control Development Unit RAAF

Transport flights
No. 9 Local Air Supply Unit RAAF 
No. 10 Local Air Supply Unit RAAF 
No. 12 Local Air Supply Unit RAAF 
No. 33 Flight RAAF
No. 200 Flight RAAF
Governor-General's Flight RAAF
RAAF Special Transport Flight
RAAF Transport Flight (Japan)
RAAF Transport Flight Vietnam
Transport Support Flight RAAF
Transport Flight Butterworth RAAF

Miscellaneous flights
No. 1 Long Range Flight RAAF
No. 5 Flight RAAF
No. 82 Wing Training Flight RAAF
No. 101 Flight RAAF
No. 201 Flight RAAF
Antarctic Flight RAAF
Lincoln Conversion Flight RAAF
Seaplane Training Flight RAAF
Survey Flight RAAF
Target Towing and Special Duties Flight RAAF
RAAF Washington Flying Unit

See also

References

Australian Air Force independent aircraft flights
 
Air
Royal Australian Air Force lists